The E Scow is an American sailing dinghy that was designed by Arnold Meyer Sr as a one-design racer and first built in 1924.

Production
The design was initially built by Johnson Boat Works in White Bear Lake, Minnesota United States, but that company closed in 1998 and production passed to Melges Performance Sailboats, who continue to build it.

Design

The E Scow is a recreational sailboat, originally built of wood and now predominantly of fiberglass sandwich construction, with wood trim. It has a fractional sloop rig with either wooden or aluminum spars and running backstays. The forestay is attached well aft of the boat's bow. The hull is a scow design, with a vertical transom, a spade-type rudder controlled by a tiller and retractable dual centerboards (also called bilgeboards). It displaces .

With the centerboards retracted it may be beached or transported on a trailer.

For sailing the design is equipped with jib and mainsail windows for visibility, plus automatic bailers. The mainsail is controlled by an outhaul, downhaul, Cunningham, boom vang and a leach cord. Under the class rules a jib luff wire and a downhaul are permitted. The boat also has a radiused mainsheet traveler and adjustable jib tracks. Only hiking straps are permitted.

The design has a Portsmouth Yardstick racing average handicap of 73.2 and is normally raced with a crew of three to five sailors.

Operational history

The boat is supported by an active class club that organizes racing events, the National Class E Scow Association. By 1994 racing fleets were sailing in Texas, Colorado, Wisconsin, Minnesota, Michigan, New York and New Jersey.

In a 1994 review Richard Sherwood wrote, "this is a very fast and sophisticated boat with a long history of development. Scows probably evolved from sharpies, and the first scows were in evidence around 1895. E Scows were born at a meeting of the Inland Lake Yachting Association in 1923. Wood has been used for many years, but since 1976 FRP has predominated."

See also
List of sailing boat types

References

External links

Dinghies
Scows
1920s sailboat type designs
Sailboat type designs by Arnold Meyer Sr
Sailboat type designs by Johnson Boat Works
Sailboat types built by Melges Performance Sailboats